EGD may refer to:

 Engadine railway station, in Sydney, Australia
 Equality-generating dependency
 Esophagogastroduodenoscopy
 Ethernet Global Data Protocol